Henri Six (born 4 May 1872, date of death unknown) was a Belgian fencer. He competed in the individual sabre event at the 1908 Summer Olympics.

References

1872 births
Year of death missing
Belgian male fencers
Belgian sabre fencers
Olympic fencers of Belgium
Fencers at the 1908 Summer Olympics